Augustine Kortu (born in Kailahun, Kailahun District, Sierra Leone) is a Sierra Leonean politician. He was Kailahun District Council chairman and mayor of Kailahun until July 2008. He is from the Kissi ethnic group.

References

Mayors of places in Sierra Leone
Living people
People from Kailahun District
Year of birth missing (living people)